Cruz Diablo is a 1934 Mexican film. It was directed by Fernando de Fuentes. The New York Times called it "one of the best films that ever crossed the Rio Grande."

References

External links
 

1930s Spanish-language films
Films directed by Fernando de Fuentes
Mexican black-and-white films
Mexican adventure films
Mexican action films
Mexican drama films
1934 adventure films
1934 drama films
1930s action films
1930s Mexican films